The 45th British Academy Film Awards, given by the British Academy of Film and Television Arts in 1992, honoured the best films of 1991.

Alan Parker's The Commitments won the awards for Best Film, Director, Adapted Screenplay and Editing. The Silence of the Lambs won the awards for Best Actor (Anthony Hopkins) and Actress (Jodie Foster). It went on to win the same Academy Awards. Alan Rickman was voted Best Actor in a Supporting Role for his work in Robin Hood: Prince of Thieves. Kate Nelligan (Frankie and Johnny) won the award for Best Supporting Actress.

Winners and nominees

Statistics

See also
 64th Academy Awards
 17th César Awards
 44th Directors Guild of America Awards
 5th European Film Awards
 49th Golden Globe Awards
 3rd Golden Laurel Awards
 12th Golden Raspberry Awards
 6th Goya Awards
 7th Independent Spirit Awards
 18th Saturn Awards
 44th Writers Guild of America Awards

References 

Film045
British Academy Film Awards
British Academy Film Awards
March 1992 events in the United Kingdom
1991 awards in the United Kingdom